Ilhamjan Iminjan (born 30 June 1986) is a Chinese footballer who plays as midfielder for Chinese club Xinjiang Alar 359.

Club career
Ilhamjan Iminjan followed Xinjiang Normal University to win 2009/10 China University Football League. He became a PE teacher at a primary school of his hometown Karamay after his graduation in 2010. He signed his first professional football contract at the age of 26 in 2012 after his impression in a trial with China League Two side Guizhou Zhicheng. He scored 12 goals in 24 appearances as Guizhou won the title and won promotion to the second tier. He was the key player of Guizhou to promoted back to China League One in 2014 season and promotion to Chinese Super League in 2016 season. Ilhamjan extended his contract with the club on 14 January 2017. He made his Super League debut on 3 March 2017 in a 1–1 home draw against Liaoning F.C.

Career statistics
.

Honours

Club
Guizhou Zhicheng
China League Two: 2012

References

External links
 

1986 births
Living people
Uyghur sportspeople
People from Karamay
Chinese footballers
Chinese people of Uyghur descent
Footballers from Xinjiang
Association football midfielders
Chinese Super League players
China League One players
China League Two players
Guizhou F.C. players